He-Man and the Masters of the Universe is an animated television series. Developed for television by Michael Halperin, who created the original series, it was animated by Mike Young Productions.  It served as an update of the   1980s Filmation series, produced to coincide with Mattel's revival of the Masters of the Universe franchise eleven years after its previous attempt.  The series premiered episodes on Cartoon Network's Toonami and SVES programming blocks between August 16, 2002, and January 10, 2004, with reruns airing until March 6, 2004.

Series overview

Episodes
The following is a list of episodes of the television series.

Season 1 (2002–03)

Season 2 (2003–04)

Notes

References

External link 

He-Man and the Masters of the Universe
He-Man and the Masters of the Universe
Masters of the Universe